Erich Friedrich Carl Walter (surname also Valter; 12 August 1894 Saint Petersburg – 8 July 1981 Gastorv, Germany) was an Estonian clergyman and politician. He was a member of IV Riigikogu. He was a member of the Riigikogu since 27 January 1930. He replaced Ervin Thomson. On 29 January 1930, he resigned his position and he was replaced by Wilhelm von Wrangell.

References

1894 births
1981 deaths
Politicians from Saint Petersburg
People from Sankt-Peterburgsky Uyezd
Baltic-German people
German-Baltic Party politicians
Members of the Riigikogu, 1929–1932
Estonian emigrants to Germany